Werner Stauff (born 16 February 1960) is a German former cyclist. He competed in the individual road race event at the 1984 Summer Olympics.

References

External links
 

1960 births
Living people
German male cyclists
Olympic cyclists of West Germany
Cyclists at the 1984 Summer Olympics
Cyclists from Cologne